Goldern may refer to

 Goldern (Aarau), a suburb of the city of Aarau, Switzerland
 Goldern (Hasliberg), a village in the municipality of Hasliberg, Bern, Switzerland